The Watch Museum of Le Locle (French: Musée d'Horlogerie du Locle) is a municipal museum specializing in horology, located in Le Locle, Canton of Neuchâtel, Switzerland.  It is open to the public.

The museum is located in a small historic country manor house, called 'Château des Monts', about one kilometer north of the city center, on a hill.

Most visitors combine a visit to this museum with the other world-class horological museum in the region the Musée international d'horlogerie in La Chaux-de-Fonds, a few kilometers further east.

Collection

The core of the museum collection is made up of several important legacies:
The Collection Maurice Yves Sandoz; the collection is particularly rich in Swiss-made automatons from the 18th and 19th century, many including mechanical music or singing bird automatons. 
The Collection Henri Jeanmaire; the strength of this collection is the marquetry clock cases by Charles André Boulle in the Louis XIV era.
The Collection Alfred Huguenin, focusing on the history of the Neuchâtel style pendule.
In these three specialized areas of horological history, several of the exhibited pieces are among the best specimens globally that are on display to the public.

On the ground floor there also is a highly concentrated comprehensive technical history of the watch movement.

The museum features also a small auditorium where a video presentation allows visitors to witness the exhibited automatons in action.

The park-like garden features several sundials and larger, sculptural clocks, including a replica of the Elephant clock of al-Jazari.

At most times there is at least one additional temporary exhibition on a horological theme.

The museum has an excellent horological library, incorporating the research archives of the Swiss horological scholar and historian Alfred Chapuis, and the former library of the French horological author Tardy. The library is open for horological scholars by appointment only.

Events

An biannual chronometry competition was organized by the museum since 2009.

See also

 Horology

References

Bibliography

External links
Musée d'Horlogerie du Locle, Château des Monts (Website available in French, German and English)

Horological museums in Switzerland
Le Locle
Museums in the canton of Neuchâtel